Nativity is a c.1380 tempera and gold on panel painting by Simone dei Crocifissi, now the only 14th century Bolognese work in the Uffizi in Florence. It is signed "Simon" and – stylistically close to another Nativity (Davia Bargellini Collection, Bologna) – it belongs to the painter's mature period.

References

1380s paintings
Paintings in the collection of the Uffizi
Simone
Paintings of Saint Joseph
Cattle in art
Donkeys in art